Troglodiplura lowryi is a species of spider in the family Anamidae, found in Australia.

References

Anamidae
Spiders of Australia
Spiders described in 1969